The 1998 Southwestern Bell Cotton Bowl Classic was a college football bowl game played on January 1, 1998, at the Cotton Bowl in Dallas, Texas. The Cotton Bowl Classic was part of the 1997 NCAA Division I-A football season.   The bowl game featured the UCLA Bruins from the Pac-10 and the Texas A&M Aggies from the Big 12.  The game was televised on CBS.

Game summary

1st quarter scoring: Texas A&M – Brandon Jennings 64-yard interception return after 19-yard return and lateral from Dat Nguyen (Kyle Bryant kick) 4:35

2nd quarter scoring: Texas A&M – Zerek Rollins tackled Cade McNown in end zone for safety; 10:18 Texas A&M – Dante Hall 74-yard run (Bryant kick) 5:54 ; UCLA – Jim McElroy 22-yard pass from McNown (Chris Sailer kick) 0:02

3rd quarter scoring: UCLA – Skip Hicks 41-yard pass from McNown (Sailer kick)12:37 ; Texas A&M - Chris Cole 43 run (Bryant kick) 8:37 ; 
UCLA – McNown 20-yard run (Sailer kick) 2:44

4th quarter scoring: UCLA – Ryan Neufeld 5-yard run (McNown run) 7:05

References

Cotton Bowl Classic
Cotton Bowl Classic
Texas A&M Aggies football bowl games
UCLA Bruins football bowl games
Cotton Bowl
January 1998 sports events in the United States
1990s in Dallas
1998 in Texas